Reel in the Closet is a 2015 documentary film directed by Stu Maddux, and featuring interviews with Daniel Nicoletta, Susan Stryker, and many others.

Synopsis
The film features LGBT home movies, videos, and other archival footage from the 1930s to 1980's, and stresses the importance of finding and restoring these films and videos.

Film premiere
The film had its world premiere on 21 June 2015 at the Frameline Film Festival.

References

External links
 
 

2015 documentary films
2015 films
American documentary films
American LGBT-related films
Documentary films about LGBT film
Films directed by Stu Maddux
2015 LGBT-related films
2010s English-language films
2010s American films